The 1971 VFL H.J. Heinz Night Premiership was the Victorian Football League end of season cup competition played in September of the 1971 VFL Premiership Season. Run as a knock-out tournament, it was contested by the eight VFL teams that failed to make the 1971 VFL finals series. Games were played at the Lake Oval, Albert Park, then the home ground of South Melbourne, as it was the only ground equipped to host night games. It was the 16th and last VFL Night Series competition, with the series disbanded the following year due to waning interest and the introduction of the final five in the premiership competition. Melbourne won its first night series cup defeating Fitzroy in the final by 16 points.

Games

Round 1

|- bgcolor="#CCCCFF"
| Winning team
| Winning team score
| Losing team
| Losing team score
| Ground
| Crowd
| Date
|- bgcolor="#FFFFFF"
| 
| 11.25 (91)
| 
| 10.10 (70)
| Lake Oval
| 10,028
| Thursday, 2 September
|- bgcolor="#FFFFFF"
| 
| 14.16 (100)
| 
| 8.10 (58)
| Lake Oval
| 7,280
| Tuesday, 7 September
|- bgcolor="#FFFFFF"
| 
| 9.15 (69)
| 
| 9.6 (60)
| Lake Oval
| 7,328
| Thursday, 9 September
|- bgcolor="#FFFFFF"
| 
| 19.20 (134)
| 
| 11.8 (74)
| Lake Oval
| 8,108
| Tuesday, 14 September

Semi-finals

|- bgcolor="#CCCCFF"
| Winning team
| Winning team score
| Losing team
| Losing team score
| Ground
| Crowd
| Date
|- bgcolor="#FFFFFF"
| 
| 16.17 (113)
| 
| 11.12 (78)
| Lake Oval
| 12,124
| Thursday, 16 September
|- bgcolor="#FFFFFF"
| 
| 14.16 (100)
| 
| 11.8 (74)
| Lake Oval
| 11,919
| Tuesday, 21 September

Final

|- bgcolor="#CCCCFF"
| Winning team
| Winning team score
| Losing team
| Losing team score
| Ground
| Crowd
| Date
|- bgcolor="#FFFFFF"
| 
| 12.7 (79)
| 
| 9.9 (63)
| Lake Oval
| 21,169
| Monday, 27 September

See also

List of Australian Football League night premiers
1971 VFL season

References

External links
 1971 VFL Night Premiership - detailed review including quarter-by-quarter scores, best players and goalkickers for each match

Australian rules football competitions in Australia